Pygmaepterys adenensis is a species of sea snail, a marine gastropod mollusk in the family Muricidae, the murex snails or rock snails.

Description

Distribution

References

External links
 Houart R. & Wranik W. (1989). Description of two new species of the genus Pygmaepterys Vokes, 1978 and report of Typhis (Talityphis) bengalensis (Radwin & D'Attilio, 1976) (Gastropoda: Muricidae), from the Gulf of Aden. Apex. 4(4): 85-90

Muricidae
Gastropods described in 1989